Soft launching is the method of launching a missile (such as an anti-tank guided missile) in such a way that the rocket motor ignites outside of the launch tube; the missile is ejected non-explosively. The objective is to minimize the risk of damage to the launcher by maintaining a safe distance.  This is in contrast with hard launching, where the missile's rocket engine is ignited while still inside the launch assembly or tube, which generates a backblast area.

A similar concept called cold launch was pioneered by the Soviet Union for application in vertical launch system clusters on board ships.

Examples 
Man-portable anti-tank guided missiles:

References

Missile launchers
Missile operation